The Allom Cup regatta is a rowing event held every November (or early December) on the River Thames in London. It is contested by the constituent colleges of the University of London. Imperial College School of Medicine still competes despite Imperial College London separating from the University of London in 2007.

The Allom Cup itself is competed for by senior men's eights. Senior women's eights compete for the Anne Redgrave Cup. There are also intermediate and novice events.

Recent Winners

See also
University rowing (UK)

References

Regattas on the River Thames
Student sport rivalries in the United Kingdom
Student sport in London